Gertrude Ibengwe Mongella (  Makanza; born 13 September 1945) is a Tanzanian politician who is the first president of the Pan-African Parliament.

Early life and work

Mongella was born in 1945 on Ukerewe Island. 
In 1970, President Mongella graduated from the University of East Africa in Dar es Salaam. 

For four years she was a tutor at Dar es Salaam Teachers Training College. In 1974, she became curriculum developer for the Dar es Salaam Institutes of Education, which she did until 1978. From 1977-92, President Mongella was a Member of the Central Committee and National Executive Committee of the CCM party. From 1975-82, she was a member of the Council of the University of Dar es Salaam, Also during this time she was on the Board of Directors for the Tanzania Rural Development Bank.

Governmental work
In the mid seventies President Mongella was a Member of the East African Legislative Assembly. Throughout the 1980s and for some part of the 1990s Mrs. Mongella was a member of the Parliament of Tanzania. From 1982 until 1988 Mongella was Minister of State within the Prime Minister's office, from there she became Minister of Lands, Tourism and Natural Resources a post she held from 1985 to 1987. Finally, from 1987 to 1990 she was a Minister Without Portfolio within the President's Office.

International work
In 1985 Mongella became Vice-Chairperson to the World Conference to Review and Appraise the Achievements of the UN Decade for Women. In 1989 Mongella was Tanzanian Representative to the Commission on the Status of Women. From 1990 to 1993 she was a Member of the Trustee to the United Nations International Research and Training Institute for the Advancement of Women (INSTRAW).

From 1991 to 1992 President Mongella was Tanzanian High Commissioner to India, in 1995 she was UN Assistant Secretary General and Secretary General, Fourth World Conference on Women on Women in Beijing, China, from 1996 to 1997 Mrs. Mongella was UN Under-Secretary and Special Envoy to the Secretary General of the United Nations on Women's Issues and Development.

In 1996 she was a Member of the Advisory Group to the Director General UNESCO for the follow-up of the Beijing Conference in Africa, South of the Sahara. Also in 1996 she was a Member of the Board for the Agency for Co-Operation and Research in Development in London. In 1996 she was a member of the board for both The Hunger Project in New York City, and the UN University in Tokyo, Japan. Also in 1996 she was President of Advocacy for Women in Africa. In 1997 Mongella was Senior Advisor to the Executive Secretary of the Economic Commission for Africa on Gender Issues.

In 1998 she became a member of the OAU sitting on the Women Committee for Peace and Development, In 1999 she was a member of the "Council of the Future", UNESCO, Paris, France, in 2000 she was a Member of the Tanzanian Parliament Ukerewe Constituency. In 2002 she was a member of the OAU's High Level Advisory Panel of Eminent Persons. In 2002 Mongella was a member of the Regional Reproduction Health Task Force for the World Health Organization's African Region, she was also leader of the OAU Election Observer Team to the Zimbabwean Presidential Election. 2003 saw her as Goodwill Ambassador for the World Health Organization's Africa Region. She became a Member and President of the Pan African Parliament in 2004. In 2005 the University of Georgia awarded her the Delta Prize for Global Understanding. She was designated Chairperson of the International Advisory Board of the African Press Organization (APO) in February 2008.

Mongella is member of the World Future Council.

Non-Governmental Organization participation
President Mongella is a member of the following NGOs:

African Press Organization. (APO)
Tanzania Association of Women Leaders in Agriculture and Environment. (TAWALE)
Society for Women and Aids in Africa Tanzania Branch. (SWAAT)
Tanzania Dental Association. (TDA)
Meaendeleo ya Wanawake Ukerewe. (MAWAU)
World Future Council

Awards and honours

Honorary Degrees
Ewha Womans University, Honorary degree, June 2005

References

External links
Kituo Cha Katiba>GERTRUDE MONGELLA
A dialogue with Ambassador Gertrude Mongella, President of the Pan African Parliament, 14 September 2004
'We must avoid being monkeys', Mail & Guardian, 16 September 2004

1945 births
Living people
Members of the Pan-African Parliament from Tanzania
Tanzanian educators
Government ministers of Tanzania
Members of the National Assembly (Tanzania)
University of Dar es Salaam alumni
20th-century Tanzanian women politicians
21st-century Tanzanian women politicians
Women government ministers of Tanzania
Women members of the Pan-African Parliament
Presidents of Pan-African Parliament